Bitter is an English style of pale ale that varies in colour from gold to dark amber, and in strength typically from 3% to 5.5% alcohol by volume.

History
The term "bitter" has been used in England to describe pale ale since the early 19th century. Although brewers used the term "pale ale", before the introduction of pump clips, customers in public houses would ask for "bitter" to differentiate it from mild ale; by the end of the 19th century, brewers had begun to use the term as well. 

During the 20th century, bitter became the most popular type of draught beer sold in British pubs and has been described as "the national drink of England". In Scotland, bitter is known as either "light" or "heavy" depending on the strength, colour and body. 

Bitter is traditionally cask conditioned and either dispensed by gravity through a tap in the cask or by a beer engine at "cellar temperature" of 11° to 14° Celsius (50° to 55° Fahrenheit). The popularity of craft brewing in North America has led to British-style bitter being brewed there since the 1980s.

Style
Bitter belongs to the pale ale beer style and can have a great variety of strength, flavour and appearance, from dark amber to a golden summer ale. It can be under 3% abv and as high as 7% with premium or strong bitters. The colour may be controlled by the addition of caramel colouring. It is similar to the India pale ale style of beer, though bitters are less hoppy. A 2020 survey by SIBA found that in 2020 the average bitter beer strength in the UK was 4.2%.

Sub-types of bitter
 A low alcohol bitter, often bottled.
 Strength up to 4.1% abv. This is the most common strength of bitter sold in British pubs. It accounted for 16.9% of pub sales in 2003.
 Strength between 4.2% and 4.7% abv. In the United Kingdom bitter above 4.2% abv accounted for just 2.9% of pub sales in 2003. The disappearance of weaker bitters from some brewers' rosters means "best" bitter is actually the weakest in the range.
 Strength of 4.8% abv and over.
 Golden or summer ale has an appearance and profile similar to that of a pale lager. Golden ale is typically brewed without the use of crystal malts, or at least in far lower quantity to a traditional bitter. In 2020, 83.5% of SIBA member breweries were producing 'pale golden bitter'

See also

Beer in England
 Copper ale
 The Campaign for Real Ale

References

External links
 

Beer styles
Beer in the United Kingdom